Vithalwadi is a town in Thane district. 

Vithalwadi is sandwitched between Kalyan and Ulhasnagar. Vithalwadi includes various areas like Kailash nagar, Hanuman Nagar and Bhagwan Nagar. Most of the population lives in slum areas which includes chawls and some old 3-4 storey buildings.

Transport 
Vithalwadi is reachable by road or railway. Vithalwadi railway station is on the Central Line of the Mumbai Suburban Railway.
It also has a state transport (ST) bus depot right in front of the railway station on the east side.

Cities and towns in Thane district